is a Japanese actress. She joined the Nikkatsu studio and appeared in about 100 films at Nikkatsu. Shiraki is well known for her role of Ritsu Nakamura on the jidaigeki television series Hissatsu.

Selected filmography

Film
The Naked Woman and the Gun (1957)
Man Who Causes a Storm (1957)
Underworld Beauty (1958)
Rusty Knife (1958)
Yoru no kiba (1958)
Subarashiki dansei (1958)
Arashi no naka o tsuppashire (1958)
Take Aim at the Police Van (1960)
Kenju burai-chō Denkō Setsuka no Otoko (1960)
Kurenai no Kenju (1961)
 Tokyo Drifter 2: The Sea is Bright Red as the Color of Love (1966)
Stray Cat Rock: Wild Jumbo (1970)
Kage Gari Hoero taiho (1972)
Hissatsu: Sure Death (1984)
Hissatsu! III Ura ka Omote ka (1986)
Sure Death 4: Revenge (1987)
Hissatsu!5 Ōgon no Chi (1991)
Hissatsu! Mondo Shisu (1996)

Television

Hissatsu series
Ōedo Sōsamō (1970–84), Koharu
Hissatsu Shiokinin (1973) as Ritsu Nakamura
Kurayami Shitomenin (1974)
Hissatsu Shiokiya Kagyō (1975)
Hissatsu Shiwazanin (1976)
Shin Hissatsu Shiokinin (1977)
Edo Professional Hissatsu Shōbainin (1978)
Hissatsu Shigotonin (1979–81)
Shin Hissatsu Shigotonin (1981–82)
Hissatsu Shigotonin III (1982–83)
Hissatsu Shigotonin IV (1984)
Hissatsu Shigotonin V (1985)
Hissatsu Shigotonin V Gekitouhen (1985–86)
Hissatsu Shigotonin V Senpuhen (1986–87)
Hissatsu Shigotonin V Fuunryūkohen (1987)
Hissatsu Shigotonin Gekitotsu (1991–92)
Hissatsu Shigotonin 2009 (2009)

References

External links 

1937 births
Living people
Japanese film actresses
People from Tokyo